The eighteenth season of American Dad! aired on TBS from April 19, 2021 to October 25, 2021.


Production
In January 2020, the series was renewed for an eighteenth and nineteenth season.

Episode list

Notes

References

2021 American television seasons
American Dad! (season 18) episodes